Hans Tabor (April 25, 1922 – November 19, 2003) was a Danish diplomat and politician representing the Social Democratic Party.

He was the Danish ambassador to the UN in the 1960s. When the Six-Day War broke out in 1967 he was the head of the United Nations Security Council, and he managed to negotiate a cease fire between Israel and the Arab countries.

Because of his success at the UN he was named Foreign Minister of Denmark by prime minister Jens Otto Krag. He only held office 4 months, because the Social Democrats lost the 1968 election. Tabor then returned to the diplomacy, and was in 1974 briefly ambassador to the UN.

References
 Tidl. udenrigsminister og ambassadør Hans Tabor død

1922 births
2003 deaths
Foreign ministers of Denmark
Danish diplomats
Permanent Representatives of Denmark to the United Nations
Politicians from Copenhagen